The Next Generation is the seventh studio album by international pop music project, Sweetbox. Released in 2009 after almost two years in the making, it is the first album to have Jamie Pineda as front woman after Jade Villalon departed for her solo career. It is also the first album to have Derek Bramble as the producer after longtime producer of the project Geo left.

The new sound that came with a new singer now featured more powerful R&B-influenced ballads and a few dance tunes co-wrote by Jamie and various writers from all around the globe including Lindy Robbins, Georgie Dennis and Derek Bramble.

The album sticks to the element Sweetbox is known for—the mixing of classical music with pop.

"We Can Work It Out" sampled Vivaldi's "Four Seasons".
"Crash Landed" sampled Bach's "Toccata & Fuge in D minor".
"Magic" sampled Beethoven's "Symphony No. 9".

In addition, a new version of "Everything's Gonna Be Alright" was recorded and featured Derek Bramble on the track singing as well with re-worded lyrics and more bass.

The album was well received in Japan and had success in Korea. In Japan the album hit #4 on the Oricon International Charts and in Korea it hit several charts including a four-week stay on Bugs and five other #1's on Soribada, Mnet, Daum, Naver and SKT NATE RT.

Production
In late 2007 after being signed to the project, Jamie Pineda got right to work on writing for her first studio album. Pineda traveled all around the globe while writing with co-writers for the album to places such as Stockholm, Frankfurt and Nashville, just to name a few. Her co-writers included top hit makers Guy Roche, Lindy Robbins and Toby Gad. For nearly 8 months she traveled while writing for the album and in June 2008 started working with the new producer of the project, songwriter/producer Derek Bramble. From June 2008 to October 2008, the two worked on the album's production. Pineda recalls in a November 2009 interview that she and Bramble were both such perfectionists that sometimes they would get into small arguments but overall the production went great.

Music
The album's lyrics are focused on primarily on love and joy. The Next Generation is mostly a pop album as showcased in the songs "More Than You'll Ever Know" and "Blue Angel" but has a strong R&B influence on such tracks as "Love Forgets" and "These Dayz".

To go along with the album, Jamie and Derek recorded a new version of the song that made Sweetbox famous, Everything's Gonna Be Alright. The new version included re-worded lyrics and also featured Derek Bramble singing on the track.

"We Can Work It Out", the album's lead single became the biggest hit from the album, reaching #27 on Japan's Billboard Hot 100 and reaching several top 10 radio charts. Amongst other successes, the single was #4 on iTunes Pop Charts in Japan. In Korea, the song was even more successful hitting #1 on 6 major charts including Bugs and Mnet, while also reaching top 10 positions on other charts like Cyworld, Soribada and Melon. "Crash Landed", the second single in Japan and the third in Korea was released where it peaked on the Gaon Charts at #12. "Crash Landed" did not chart anywhere in Japan. The third overall single, "Everything is Nothing", a mid-tempo dance track was released in Korea as the second single. Before the song was even released as a single in Korea, it reached several top 10 chart positions including Daum and Bugs. Although it had no release in Japan, the song reached #7 on iTunes Pop charts. The song is also featured in the Korean version of Audition Online.

Album information
To go along with the lead single "We Can Work It Out", a Yasutaka Nakata remix of Everything's Gonna Be Alright received airplay in Japan.

Because the previous singer of the project Jade Villalon was with the project so long and was releasing an album around the same time as Pineda, fans pitted the two against one another.

In May 2009, Jamie went to Japan to promote the album. She performed at various shows including Warner Japan's FRESHNESS event and a promotional appearance and performance at J-Wave's HAPPINESS program.

Reception

Critical
The album received mixed reviews. While Jamie had gained new fans as the new face of Sweetbox, some fans were critical of the change. Some listeners blamed not Pineda, but the songs for not liking the album as they were almost all slow songs. Standout tracks to most fans included the lead single, "We Can Work It Out" and the pop ballad "With a Love Like You".

Commercial
While the album did not surpass sells of previous Sweetbox albums, the album in no way did bad on the charts. The album was well received in Japan and had incredible success in Korea. In Japan the album hit #4 on the Oricon International Charts and in Korea it hit several charts including a 4-week stay on Bugs and 5 other #1's on Soribada, Mnet, Daum, Naver and SKT NATE RT.

Singles
"We Can Work It Out" was the first single from the album, released in April 2009 in Japan and November 2009 in Korea. It became the biggest charting single from the album, finding itself on several top 5 radio positions in Japan and reaching #4 on Japan's iTunes Pop Charts.
"Crash Landed" was the second single to be released in Japan in July 2009 and the third to be released in Korea in April 2010. In Japan, the single didn't chart as well as "We Can Work It Out" but received quite a bit of airplay on radio. The single reached #12 on the International Gaon chart.
"Everything is Nothing" was second single to be released to Korea in February 2010. The song charted well in Korea, reaching #4 on the International Gaon Chart. Despite not being released as a single in Japan, Everything is Nothing was #7 on iTunes Pop Charts.

Track listing

Notes
The song "Rockstar" was the only song not produced by Derek Bramble. It was instead produced by George "Chico" Bennett & Richard "Vission" Gonzales.
A "European Import" version was released digitally through digital music programs and websites like Amie Street and iTunes that featured a wedding mix for "We Can Work It Out" and also had the song "Rockstar" on it. The Japanese re-release featured the song "Rockstar" as well.

Release history

Musicians
Jamie Pineda - Vocals
G'harah "PK" Degeddingseze - Programming & Keys
Alex Alessandroni - AC Pianos
Brett Farkas - Guitars
Mike Herring - Guitars
Derek Bramble - Bass, Guitars, Keys, Percussions, Vocals
Amanda Wheeler - Background vocals
Sutan Brittan - Background vocals
Steve Lu - String Arrangements
L.A. Strings - String Arrangements
Grace Lee - Violins

Production
Producers: Derek Bramble on all tracks except "Rockstar" which was produced by George "Chico" Bennett & Richard "Vission" Gonzales.
Executive Producer: Heiko Schmidt
Production Coordinator: Michael Anderson
Engineers: Rob Chiarelli

References

Sweetbox albums
2009 albums